Aleksandr Fedotkin (November 3, 1955 – before 2005) was a long-distance runner who represented the Soviet Union. He won a silver medal at the 1978 European Athletics Championships, tied with Markus Ryffel, as well as a bronze medal at the 1979 European Athletics Indoor Championships, 5,000 meters final

Achievements

References 

1955 births
Year of death missing
Soviet male long-distance runners
European Athletics Championships medalists
Athletes (track and field) at the 1980 Summer Olympics
Olympic athletes of the Soviet Union